Dadhibaman College, Bhatli was founded in 1990. The College is located in Bhatli in the district of Bargarh, Odisha, India amidst a serene surrounding. It is a co-educational institution with a strength of more than 380 students and is affiliated to Sambalpur University.The college offers Hons facility in subject like Economics, History, Political Science, Education and Sanskrit. The College has a Library which the students and the faculty use invariably.

Courses available
Economics, History, Political Science, Education, Sanskrit, Odiya and english Hons 
total seat==192,

Academic staff
 Mr. Jayasen Bhoi, Lect. in History
 Dr. Mitrabhanu Sahu, Lect. in Odia
 Mr. Shyamlal Nayak, Lect. in Political Science
 Mr. Biswajit Hota, Lect. in English
 Mr. Rajiba Sahu, Lect. in Sanskrit
 Mr. R.N. Panda, Lect. in Economics
 Mrs. Sonia Mahakur, Lect. in Education
 Mr. Prakash Debta
 Mrs. Rajashree Nath, Lect. in Sanskrit
 Mrs. Jayanti Sahoo, Lect. in Economics
 Miss Muni Sahu, Lect. in Education
 Mr. Ajit Barik, Lect. in Political Science

Hostel accommodation
Nivedita Hostel is for women student admitted to the Dadhibaman College, Bhatli

Activities
Annual college sports,
NCC, NSS activities,
Programmes organised by government,
Annual function,
Annual college magazine programme,
Awareness programmes,
Laptop distribution.

References

External links
 

Department of Higher Education, Odisha
Universities and colleges in Odisha
Bargarh district
Colleges_affiliated_to_Sambalpur_University
1990 establishments in Orissa
Educational institutions established in 1990